Lawal Musa Daura mni (born August 5, 1953) is a Nigerian security official who was the Director General of the State Security Service (SSS) from 2 July 2015 to 7 August 2018.

Background and education
Lawal Musa Daura was born on 5 August 1953 in Daura. In 1980, he received a bachelor's degree from Ahmadu Bello University in Zaria and also trained at the National Institute for Policy and Strategic Studies in Kuru, Nigeria.

In 1982, Daura joined the National Security Organization (NSO) which was later replaced in 1986 with the State Security Service (SSS) by military head of state General Ibrahim Babangida. He rose through the ranks of the NSO and the subsequent SSS, eventually becoming a Director of Security in several states of the federation at various times: including Kano, Sokoto, Edo, Lagos, Osun and Imo.

References

Living people
Directors General of the State Security Service (Nigeria)
Directors of the Nigerian State Security Service
Ahmadu Bello University alumni
Nigerian security personnel
National Security Organization staff
Members of the Nigerian National Institute of Policy and Strategic Studies
1953 births